Ljubiša Milojević (born 7 April 1967) is a Serbian former footballer who played as a forward.

Career
After starting out at his hometown club Sloga Kraljevo, Milojević was transferred to Red Star Belgrade in the summer of 1989. He was later sent out on loan to fellow Yugoslav First League side Rad during the 1989–90 season. Subsequently, Milojević returned to Red Star Belgrade and played eight games in the title-winning 1990–91 Yugoslav First League. He rejoined Rad in the summer of 1991, scoring 12 goals in 31 matches during the 1991–92 Yugoslav First League.

In the summer of 1992, Milojević moved abroad to Greece and signed with Aris Thessaloniki. He amassed 149 Alpha Ethniki appearances and scored 38 goals for the club over the course of five seasons. He also played for Beta Ethniki side Panetolikos, before retiring from the game.

Honours
Red Star Belgrade
 Yugoslav First League: 1990–91

References

External links
 

Aris Thessaloniki F.C. players
Association football forwards
Expatriate footballers in Greece
FK Rad players
FK Sloga Kraljevo players
Panetolikos F.C. players
Red Star Belgrade footballers
Serbia and Montenegro expatriate footballers
Serbia and Montenegro expatriate sportspeople in Greece
Serbia and Montenegro footballers
Serbian footballers
Sportspeople from Kraljevo
Super League Greece players
Yugoslav First League players
Yugoslav footballers
1967 births
Living people